Pierre Bellon (24 January 1930 – 31 January 2022) was a French billionaire businessman, the founder of Sodexo, a multinational food service and facilities management company.

Early life
Pierre Bellon earned a degree from HEC Paris.

Career
Bellon joined the Société d'exploitations hôtelières, aériennes, maritimes et terrestres in 1958. He started as a managing assistant, and rose to become CEO of the company.

In 1966, he founded Sodexho SA (renamed Sodexo in 2008). Sodexo supplies a variety of auxiliary services for thousands of institutions, including schools, hospitals, retirement centers, corporate and government offices, armed forces, recreational facilities, and correctional institutions. Sodexo is a public traded company on New York and Paris exchanges.

Bellon relinquished the group CEO position of Sodexo in 2005, but continued as the chairman of the company until January 2016, when his daughter Sophie Bellon succeeded him as chairman.

In 1987, he contributed to the creation of the non-profit Association Progrès du Management, which purpose is to focus on the progress of the company through the progress of its leaders.

His autobiography is entitled I Have Had a Great Time.

Personal life and death
Bellon was married, with four children, and lived in Paris. He died on 31 January 2022, at the age of 92.

References 

1930 births
2022 deaths
HEC Paris alumni
French billionaires
French company founders
Businesspeople from Marseille
Commandeurs of the Légion d'honneur